= Gal-Sal =

Slave owner

Gal-Sal (fl. c. 3100 BC) was a slave owner. He is one of the oldest recorded people in human history. His name was found on a tablet in Iraq.

He owned 2 slaves: a man, En-pap X, and a woman, Sukkalgir.
